The Hymn Society in the United States and Canada – founded in 1922 as The Hymn Society of America and renamed in 1991 – is a not-for-profit organization for those people who:
 believe that congregational song is an integral component of worship 
 believe that the writing and singing of new texts and tunes needs to be promoted 
 value learning about the origins of the words and music they sing

Members of The Hymn Society include clergy and worship leaders, church musicians, poets, composers, scholars, libraries and congregational singers of varied backgrounds and interests.  Members of all denominations, races and cultures participate in the annual conferences and workshops sponsored by The Hymn Society. The Society produces a quarterly publication, The Hymn, a journal of research and opinion, containing practical and scholarly articles and reflecting the diverse cultural and theological identities of the organization's membership. In 1984 it published, on microfilm, the Dictionary of American Hymnody (edited by Leonard Ellinwood and Elizabeth Lockwood), an index to the texts of more than 8000 North American hymnals.

Center for Congregational Song
The Center for Congregational Song (CCS) is the resource and programmatic arm of The Hymn Society in the United States and Canada. Run by The Hymn Society and funded by Society members and donors, it works to fulfill The Hymn Society's mission to "encourage, promote, and enliven congregational singing".  The current Director of the CCS is Brian Hehn.

References

External links
 

Musical advocacy groups
Organizations established in 1922
1922 establishments in the United States
Non-profit organizations based in Washington, D.C.